The St Vincent's Works is a former factory and offices at Silverthorne Lane in Bristol, England.

The building was built as offices and factory by Thomas Royse Lysaght, for his brother John Lysaght of John Lysaght and Co. with the buildings being completed by R Milverton Drake. The site was previously owned by Acraman and Company and was involved in the manufacture of corrugated-iron and pre-fabricated buildings, which were exported around the world and particular to settlers in Australia. By 1878 the factory employed 400 men and produced 1000 tons of galvanised iron sheet a month.  The company also diversified into making constructional ironwork, exported around the world from Bristol.

The building was home to the head office of renewable energy consultancy GL Garrad Hassan.

It is an example of the Bristol Byzantine style and various of the buildings have Grade II listed building status.

The company offices are Grade II* listed. The offices were built in a Gothic style with a domed atrium decorated with golden Doulton tiles. The offices have wood panelling and throughout the building are elaborate decorations.

In January 2018, the building was leased by Colliers International on behalf of a private landlord to the newly founded film production company, Screenology. The building is now under a ten-year contract with Screenology.

References

See also
 Grade II* listed buildings in Bristol

Industrial buildings in England
Industrial buildings completed in 1891
Office buildings completed in 1891
Grade II* listed buildings in Bristol
Grade II* listed industrial buildings
Byzantine Revival architecture in the United Kingdom